Glenevis is a hamlet in central Alberta, Canada within Lac Ste. Anne County.

The community takes its name from Glennevis, in Nova Scotia.

Climate

Demographics 
The population of Glenevis according to the 2008 municipal census conducted by Lac Ste. Anne County is 49.

See also 
List of communities in Alberta
List of hamlets in Alberta

References 

Hamlets in Alberta
Lac Ste. Anne County